Mastera Literary Award is a regional prize awarded since 1999 for the best prose and poetic works, as well as for literary criticism in Malay of the writers of the South-East Asian countries. The founder of the award is the Southeast Asian Literature Council, abbreviated as Mastera. 

The Council was established in 1995. Founding countries: Brunei, Indonesia, Malaysia. In 2012, it was joined by Singapore which previously had observer status, and in 2014 by Thailand. Representatives of Viet Nam and Philippines where there are minorities who speak Malay languages  periodically participate in the activity of the Council. 

Prizes are awarded every two years for works published during the two previous years. Winners receive diplomas and a bonus of 10,000 Malaysian ringgit.

Mastera Literary Award Recipients

Mastera Literary Award Recipients (1999)

Mastera Literary Award Recipients (2001)

Mastera Literary Award Recipients (2003)

Mastera Literary Award Recipients(2005)

Mastera Literary Award Recipients (2007)

Mastera Literary Award Recipients (2010)

Mastera Literary Award Recipients (2012)

Mastera Literary Award Recipients (2016)

Mastera Literary Award Recipients (2021)

References

International literary awards
Malay-language literature